Charlotte Cecilia MacGibbon (née Weeks, 27 September 1924 – 10 January 2009) was an Australian former track and field athlete.

In 1940, MacGibbon won her first national title in the javelin throw, aged just 15.  In total, she won six national championships between 1940 and 1952, including two in the discus throw; she also placed third in the shot put in 1947. At the 1950 British Empire Games she became the first Australian athlete to win an international throwing event, taking the javelin with a distance of 38.84 m.

In 2006, at the age of 81, she participated in the 2006 Commonwealth Games Queen's baton relay.

References

1924 births
2009 deaths
Australian female javelin throwers
Australian female discus throwers
Commonwealth Games gold medallists for Australia
Athletes (track and field) at the 1950 British Empire Games
Commonwealth Games medallists in athletics
20th-century Australian women
Medallists at the 1950 British Empire Games